Tuk or TUK may refer to:

 Tuk, a village in the Netherlands
 nickname for Tuktoyaktuk, a hamlet in the Northwest Territories, Canada
 IATA code for Turbat International Airport
 The genre of music played by a Tuk band, a kind of Barbadian musical ensemble
 Liev Tuk, Cambodian singer

See also
Tuck (disambiguation)
Tuks (disambiguation)
 Tuk Tuk, a motorized rickshaw